Noppon Saengkham (born 15 July 1992) is a Thai professional snooker player.

Career

Early years
In April 2009, Saengkham lost in the final of the ACBS Asian Under-21 Snooker Championship 1–5 to Zhang Anda. He went one better at the 2009 IBSF World Under-21 Snooker Championship by claiming the title with a 9–8 win over Soheil Vahedi in the final. It also secured his place on the main snooker tour for the 2010/2011 season.

Professional debut
He lost his first three matches as a professional, only picking up one frame in the process before beating Luca Brecel 3–1 in qualifying for the 2010 World Open. He lost to Martin Gould 0–3 in the next round and could only win one more match in the next six months. The closest he came to qualifying for a ranking event came at the Welsh Open where he beat Matthew Couch 4–2 and Adrian Gunnell 4–0, but then lost 1–4 to Nigel Bond. Saengkham ended his first season ranked world number 92 which relegated him from the tour.

Saengkham did not play a match in a professional snooker event during the 2011/2012 season. In the 2012/2013 season he came through Group G of the 2012 Six-red World Championship, but then lost 5–6 to Graeme Dott in the last 32. He was awarded a wildcard for the 2013 World Open and lost 4–5 to Mark Joyce. In April he won the ACBS Asian Under-21 Snooker Championship by defeating Pakistan's Mohammad Majid Ali 6–5 on the final pink. The title earned him a place back on the snooker tour for the 2013/2014 season.

2013/2014 season
In qualifying for the 2013 Australian Goldfields Open, Saengkham beat Andrew Pagett 5–3 and Thanawat Thirapongpaiboon, Anthony McGill and Jamie Jones all by 5–1 scorelines to reach the main draw of a ranking event for the first time in his career. He played Stuart Bingham in the first round and lost 5–1. He also won through to the last 32 stage of the UK Championship with victories over Tom Ford and Sean O'Sullivan, before being beaten 6–2 by Shaun Murphy. Saengkham made it to the second round of the Welsh Open and World Open, but lost to multiple ranking event winners in Mark Allen and Mark Selby respectively. Saengkham's season ended when he was edged out 10–9 by Vinnie Calabrese in the first round of World Championship qualifying. He finished the season ranked world number 84.

2014/2015 season
Saengkham defeated Alfie Burden 6–4 to qualify for the International Championship and beat Stephen Maguire 6–5, before losing in another deciding frame in the second round to Xiao Guodong. He was knocked out in the first round of the UK Championship 6–1 by Luca Brecel. Saengkham eliminated David Grace, Mitchell Mann, Ross Muir and Kurt Maflin at the Lisbon Open to reach his first quarter-final in a ranking event, where he lost 4–2 to Maguire. He was unable to build on this during the rest of the season as he lost eight of his last nine matches with his only win coming against German amateur Lukas Kleckers in the first round of World Championship qualifying. Saengkham finished the year outside of the top 64 in the world rankings (he was 71st), but his good play in the European Tour events saw him placed 43rd on the Order of Merit to earn a new two-year tour card.

2015/2016 season
In his homeland, Saengkham beat the likes of reigning world champion Stuart Bingham and ranking event winners Michael White and Joe Perry to play in the semi-finals of the 2015 Six-red World Championship, where he lost 7–3 to compatriot Thepchaiya Un-Nooh. A 6–2 win over Stephen Maguire saw him qualify for the International Championship for the second year in a row, but he was knocked out 6–4 by Oliver Lines in the opening round. He lost 6–5 and 4–3 in the first rounds of both the UK Championship and Welsh Open to Xiao Guodong and Fergal O'Brien respectively. Saengkham won a deciding frame against Lines to qualify for the China Open. He shocked Neil Robertson 5–3 in the first round and then beat Ben Woollaston 5–4 and Graeme Dott 5–1 to make the quarter-finals of a ranking event for the first time. A bad start from Saengkham saw him lose the opening four frames to John Higgins, but he then pulled it back to 4–3. Saengkham missed a yellow in the next frame and would be defeated 5–3. His final match of the season was a 10–8 loss to Dott in the second round of World Championship qualifying.

2016/2017 season
Saengkham had to wait until October to win his first match of the season in the main draw of a ranking event when he beat Michael Georgiou 4–1 at the English Open. He lost 4–0 to Xiao Guodong in the second round. A 6–0 thrashing of Ken Doherty saw him reach the second round of the UK Championship, where he made a 131 break to lead John Higgins 3–2, before going on to be defeated 6–4. He reached the last 32 of the Scottish Open by beating Craig Steadman and Aditya Mehta, but he was whitewashed 4–0 by Judd Trump. Saengkham defeated Tom Ford 5–3 to qualify for the China Open. A 5–3 victory against Robert Milkins followed and he then lost 5–2 to Stuart Bingham. After Saengkham overcame Jak Jones 10–5 and Anthony Hamilton 10–9 he was one win away from qualifying for the World Championship. He overturned a 6–3 deficit against Lee Walker to win 10–8 and met Neil Robertson in the first round. Saengkham lost the opening session 8–1 and, though he won three of the next four frames, he was defeated 10–4. The run meant he finished the season 64th in the world rankings.

Personal life
Saengkham's daughter was born in April 2022 in Thailand He couldn't attend the birth, as he was competing in his first round match against Belgian Luca Brecel at the 2022 World Snooker Championship.

Performance and rankings timeline

Career finals

Pro-am finals: 1

Amateur finals: 4 (2 titles)

References

External links

 
Noppon Saengkham at worldsnooker.com

Living people
1992 births
Noppon Saengkham
Noppon Saengkham
Southeast Asian Games medalists in cue sports
Competitors at the 2011 Southeast Asian Games
Competitors at the 2013 World Games
Noppon Saengkham